Stanley Seymour Brotman (July 27, 1924 – February 21, 2014) was a United States district judge of the United States District Court for the District of New Jersey.

Education and career
Brotman was born in Vineland, New Jersey. He grew up in the nearby community of Brotmanville, which had been established by his grandfather, a Russian immigrant, in Pittsgrove Township. Brotman left Yale University to serve in the United States Army during World War II, from 1942 to 1945. He returned to Yale and received a Bachelor of Arts degree in Eastern Studies in 1947. He received a Bachelor of Laws from Harvard Law School in 1951. He served again during the Korean War from 1951 to 1952 as a first lieutenant in the Armed Forces Security Agency. He was in private practice in Vineland from 1952 to 1975.

Federal judicial service

On January 27, 1975, Brotman was nominated by President Gerald Ford to a seat on the United States District Court for the District of New Jersey vacated by Judge Mitchell Harry Cohen. Brotman was confirmed by the United States Senate on March 13, 1975, and received his commission on March 14, 1975. He assumed senior status on April 23, 1990 and was succeeded by Judge William G. Bassler. Brotman served on the United States Foreign Intelligence Surveillance Court from May 1998 to May 2005. In addition to his duties in the District of New Jersey, Brotman served on temporary assignments to the United States District Court for the Virgin Islands for over twenty years and was designated by the United States Court of Appeals for the Third Circuit as the Acting Chief Judge of that court from December 22, 1989 to August 14, 1992. Brotman stopped hearing cases in September 2013, but remained a federal judge until his death.

Death

A resident of Voorhees Township, New Jersey, Brotman died on February 21, 2014, at the age of 89, at a hospital in Stratford, New Jersey.

See also
 List of Jewish American jurists

References

Sources
 

1924 births
2014 deaths
People from Pittsgrove Township, New Jersey
People from Vineland, New Jersey
People from Voorhees Township, New Jersey
Yale College alumni
Harvard Law School alumni
Judges of the United States District Court for the District of New Jersey
United States district court judges appointed by Gerald Ford
20th-century American judges
United States Army officers
United States Army personnel of World War II
Judges of the United States Foreign Intelligence Surveillance Court